was a Japanese actor, voice actor and narrator from Tokyo. He was attached to the Tokyo Actor's Consumer's Cooperative Society. He was a graduate of the Tokyo Metropolitan Koishikawa High School and the arts department of Nihon University.

He was best known for his roles in Yōkai Ningen Bem (as Bem), the Lupin III series (as Daisuke Jigen), the Droopy cartoons (as the Wolf) and Shazzan (as Shazzan). As a narrator, he is best known for narrating Shukan Oriraji Keizaihakusho and Hikari Ota's If I Were Prime Minister... Secretary Tanaka. Also, he was the official dub-over voice of James Coburn and Lee Marvin.

In 2021, he retired from his role as the voice of Daisuke Jigen, after over 50 years of service.

His talent management agency Haikyo announced that he died on July 30, 2022, due to pneumonia.

Filmography

Television animation
Star of the Giants (1968) (Armstrong Ozuma)
Yōkai Ningen Bem (1968) (Bem)
Lupin the Third Part I (1971) (Daisuke Jigen) 
La Seine no Hoshi (1975) (Zarar)
Lupin the Third Part II (1977) (Daisuke Jigen) 
Space Cobra (1982) (Crystal Bowie)
Lupin III Part III (1984) (Daisuke Jigen) 
The King of Braves GaoGaiGar (1997) (Narrator)
Basilisk (2005) (Kouga Danjo)
The King of Braves GaoGaiGar Final -Grand Glorious Gathering- (2005) (Narrator, Ryōsuke Takanohashi)
Death Note (2006) (Watari/Quillsh Wammy)
Lupin the Third: The Woman Called Fujiko Mine (2012) (Daisuke Jigen)
Lupin the 3rd Part IV (2015) (Daisuke Jigen)
Lupin the 3rd Part V (2018) (Daisuke Jigen)
Lupin the 3rd Part 6 (2021) (Daisuke Jigen) (episode 0 only)

OVA
Megazone 23 (1985) (Eigen Yumekanou)
Violence Jack (1988) (Jack)
Legend of the Galactic Heroes (1988) (Adrian Rubinsky)
Mobile Suit Gundam 0083: Stardust Memory (1991) (Aiguille Delaz)
JoJo's Bizarre Adventure (1993) (Muhammad Avdol)
Queen Emeraldas (1998) (Captain)
The King of Braves GaoGaiGar Final (2000) (Narrator, Ryōsuke Takanohashi)
Lupin III: Return of the Magician (2002) (Daisuke Jigen)
Amuri in Star Ocean (2008) (Deus Allen, Ukatan)
Lupin III: Green Vs. Red (2008) (Daisuke Jigen)

Animated films
Mazinger Z vs. Devilman (1973) (Mashogun Zannin)
Lupin III: Mystery of Mamo (1978) (Daisuke Jigen)
Lupin III: The Castle of Cagliostro (1979) (Daisuke Jigen)
Twelve Months (1980) (January)
Crusher Joe (1983) (Talos)
Golgo 13: The Professional (1983) (T. Jefferson)
Lupin III: Legend of the Gold of Babylon (1985) (Daisuke Jigen)
Mobile Suit Gundam F91 (1991) (Gillet Krueger)
Doraemon: Nobita and the Kingdom of Clouds (1992) (Earthling A)
Lupin III: Farewell to Nostradamus (1995) (Daisuke Jigen)
Lupin III: Dead or Alive (1996) (Daisuke Jigen)
Case Closed: The Phantom of Baker Street (2002) (James Moriarty)
Doraemon: Nobita and the Windmasters (2003) (Uranda)
Crayon Shin-chan: The Storm Called: The Kasukabe Boys of the Evening Sun (2004) (Justice Love)
Space Pirate Captain Harlock (2013) (Old man)
Lupin the 3rd vs. Detective Conan: The Movie (2013) (Daisuke Jigen)
Lupin the IIIrd: Jigen's Gravestone (2014) (Daisuke Jigen)
Lupin the IIIrd: Goemon Ishikawa's Spray of Blood (2017) (Daisuke Jigen)
Lupin the IIIrd: Fujiko Mine's Lie (2019) (Daisuke Jigen)
Lupin The Third: The First (2019) (Daisuke Jigen)

Tokusatsu
Kousoku Esper (1967) (Alien Giron)
Spectreman (1971) (Dr. Gori)
Kaiketsu Lion-Maru (1972) (Daimaou Gohsun)
Zone Fighter (1973) (Narrator)
Enban Senso Bankid (1976) (Guzale Commander)
UFO Daisensou: Tatakae Red Tiger (1978) (Fuller Commander)
Kamen Rider Black (1987) (Narrator (1 - 39))
Godzilla vs. Mechagodzilla II (1993) (Narrator)
Chōriki Sentai Ohranger (1995) (Bara Darts)
Gekisou Sentai Carranger (1996) (VRV Master)
Seijuu Sentai Gingaman (1998) (Degius)
Kamen Rider OOO (2010) (Story within a story Narrator)
Space Sheriff Gavan: The Movie (2012) (Narrator)

Video games
Blood Will Tell (xxxx) (Narrator, Jukai)
BS Zelda no Densetsu (MAP1 and MAP2) (xxxx) (Narrator)
Samurai Shodown series (II, IV-V) (Jubei Yagyu)
Tenchu: Kurenai (xxxx) (Narrator)
Lupin III video games (1997-2010) (Daisuke Jigen)
Lupin the 3rd: Treasure of the Sorcerer King (2002) (Daisuke Jigen)
World of Final Fantasy (2016) (Odin)

Dubbing roles

Live-action
James Coburn
The Magnificent Seven (1974 NET Dub) (Britt)
The Great Escape (1971 Fuji TV Dub) (Louis Sedgwick)
Charade (1972 Fuji TV, 1985 TV Asahi, and 1994 NTV Dubs) (Tex Panthollow)
Major Dundee (1976 Fuji TV Dub) (Samuel Potts)
Our Man Flint (1978 Fuji TV Dub) (Derek Flint)
Dead Heat on a Merry-Go-Round (Eli Kotch)
In Like Flint (1973 Tokyo Channel 12 Dub) (Derek Flint)
Duck, You Sucker! (1977 TBS and DVD Dubs) (John H. Mallory)
Pat Garrett and Billy the Kid (Sheriff Pat Garrett)
Bite the Bullet (1981 TV Asahi Dub) (Luke Matthews)
Hard Times (1981 TV Asahi Dub)(Speed)
The Last Hard Men (1981 Fuji TV Dub) (Zach Provo)
Midway (1979 TBS edition) (Capt. Vinton Maddox)
Young Guns II (VHS Dub) (John Chisum)
Hudson Hawk (DVD Dub)(George Kaplan)
Sister Act 2: Back in the Habit (Mr. Crisp)
Maverick (Commodore Duvall)
Eraser (Arthur Beller)
The Nutty Professor (Harlan Hartley)
Payback (Fairfax)
Snow Dogs (James "Thunder Jack" Johnson)
American Gun (Martin Tillman)
Lee Marvin
The Caine Mutiny (1979 Fuji TV edition) ("Meatball")
Bad Day at Black Rock (1969 Tokyo Channel 12 and 1973 NTV editions) (Hector David)
Attack (TV Asahi edition) (Lt. Col. Clyde Bartlett)
The Comancheros (TV Asahi edition) (Tully Crow)
The Man Who Shot Liberty Valance (1971 Fuji TV Dub)  (Liberty Valance)
Donovan's Reef (1969 Tokyo Channel 12 and 1975 TBS Dubs)(Thomas Aloysius "Boats" Gilhooley)
The Killers (Charlie Strom)
Cat Ballou (1972 NET edition) (Kid Shelleen and Tim Strawn)
The Professionals (1980 TV Asahi Dub) (Henry 'Rico' Fardan)
Point Blank (1972 NET Dub)(Walker)
Paint Your Wagon (1978 Tokyo Channel 12 Dub)  (Ben Rumson)
Emperor of the North Pole (1977 Tokyo Channel 12 edition) (A-No.-1)
Avalanche Express (1981 NTV edition) (Wargrave)
The Big Red One (1982 TBS edition) (The Sergeant)
Gorky Park (Jack Osborne)
Tommy Lee Jones
Fire Birds (1993 TV Asahi edition) (Brad Little)
JFK (1994 TV Asahi edition) (Clay Shaw / Clay Bertrand)
The Fugitive (1996 TV Asahi edition) (Marshal Samuel Gerard)
Batman Forever (1998 TV Asahi edition) (Harvey Dent/Two-Face)
Blown Away (Ryan Gaerity)
Volcano (2005 TV Asahi edition) (Mike Roark)
U.S. Marshals (2004 TV Tokyo edition) (Chief Deputy Marshal Samuel Gerard)
The Hunted (2008 TV Tokyo edition) (L.T. Bonham)
A Prairie Home Companion (Axeman)
The Family (Robert Stansfield)
George Kennedy
Airport (Joe Patroni)
Cahill U.S. Marshal (Abe Fraser)
Earthquake (1986 TV Asahi edition) (Lou Slade)
The Concorde ... Airport '79 (1982 TV Asahi edition) (Capt. Joe Patroni)
Death Ship (Captain Ashland)
Sam Elliott
Shakedown (Richie Marks)
The Hi-Lo Country (Jim Ed Love)
The Contender (Kermit Newman)
Ghost Rider (Carter Slade / Caretaker)
The Golden Compass (Lee Scoresby)
Franco Nero
Django (1971 TV Asahi, 1975 TBS and 1980 TV Tokyo editions) (Django)
Texas, Adios (1989 TV Tokyo edition) (Burt Sullivan)
Force 10 from Navarone (DVD and 1986 TV Asahi editions) (Lescovar)
Die Hard 2 (1992 Fuji TV edition) (General Ramon Esperanza)
Jack Palance
Shane (1974 NTV and 1979 TV Asahi editions) (Jack Wilson)
Torture Garden (Ronald Wyatt)
Compañeros (John)
City Slickers (TV Tokyo edition) (Curly Washburn)
Christopher Plummer
The Silent Partner (1983 Fuji TV edition) (Harry Reikle)
The Insider (Mike Wallace)
Knives Out (Harlan Thrombey)
The Last Full Measure (Frank Pitsenbarger)
Gian Maria Volonté
A Fistful of Dollars (1971 TV Asahi edition) (Ramón Rojo)
For a Few Dollars More (1973 TV Asahi edition) (El Indio)
A Bullet for the General (El Chuncho Muños)
Clint Eastwood
True Crime (Steve Everett)
Space Cowboys (Colonel Frank Corvin)
Blood Work (Terry McCaleb)
The Best Years of a Life (Jean-Louis Duroc (Jean-Louis Trintignant))
Beverly Hills Cop II (1990 Fuji TV edition) (Detective John Taggart (John Ashton))
Cutthroat Island (Douglas "Dawg" Brown (Frank Langella))
Dr. Dolittle (Jacob the Tiger (Albert Brooks))
Face to Face (1977 TV Asahi edition) (Solomon "Beauregard" Bennet (Tomas Milian))
A Few Good Men (Colonel Nathan Jessup (Jack Nicholson))
Flash Gordon (1992 TV Asahi edition) (Ming the Merciless (Max von Sydow))
The Godfather (1976 NTV edition) (Virgil "The Turk" Sollozzo (Al Lettieri))
The Golden Child (1989 Fuji TV edition) (Sardo Numspa (Charles Dance))
The Good, the Bad and the Ugly (Union Captain (Aldo Giuffre))
Good Night, and Good Luck (Edward R. Murrow (David Strathairn))
Gunfight at the O.K. Corral (1975 TV Tokyo edition) (Johnny Ringo (John Ireland))
Hard Rain (Jim (Morgan Freeman))
The Hitcher (1987 TV Tokyo edition) (Captain Esteridge (Jeffrey DeMunn))
The Hunt for Red October (Captain 1st rank Marko Ramius (Sean Connery))
Indiana Jones and the Temple of Doom (Lao Che (Roy Chiao))
Knight Rider (Narrator)
The Lord of the Rings: The Return of the King (Witch-king of Angmar (Lawrence Makoare))
Near Dark (Jesse Hooker (Lance Henriksen))
Pirates of the Caribbean: At World's End (Captain Edward Teague (Keith Richards))
Pirates of the Caribbean: On Stranger Tides (Captain Edward Teague (Keith Richards))
Presumed Innocent (Raymond Horgan (Brian Dennehy))
Rome (Pompey Magnus (Kenneth Cranham))
The Rookie (Strom (Raul Julia))
Seven Golden Men Strike Again (1975 TV Asahi edition) (Adolf (Gastone Moschin))
Snatch ("Brick Top" Pulford (Alan Ford))
They Live (1990 TV Asahi edition) (Frank Armitage (Keith David))
Tremors (Burt Gummer (Michael Gross))
Teenage Mutant Ninja Turtles (Splinter)
Yes Man (Terrence Bundley (Terence Stamp))
The Young Master (Sang Kung (Shih Kien))

Animation
Adventure Time (Ice President)
Balto II: Wolf Quest (Nava)
Batman: The Animated Series (Jonah Hex)
Droopy (The Wolf)
Oliver & Company (Roscoe)
Samurai Jack (Thief)
Shazzan (Shazzan)
SWAT Kats: The Radical Squadron (Katscratch)
Teenage Mutant Ninja Turtles (Splinter)
The Incredibles (Rick Dicker)
The Road to El Dorado (Hernán Cortés)
Thunderbirds (Commander Norman)
Totally Spies! (Jerry)
X-Men (TV Tokyo edition) (Forge)

Other roles
Battle of Okinawa (1971, Film) (Narrator)
Daitokai Series (1976–79, Tv drama)
Dragon Zakura (2005, TV drama) (Narrator)
Hikari Ota's If I Were Prime Minister... Secretary Tanaka (2006, Variety show) (Narrator)
Pro Sportsman No.1 (1995-2010, Sports entertainment television special) (Narrator)
Sasuke (2006, Sports entertainment television special) (Narrator)
Shukan Oriraji Keizaihakusho (2007, Variety show) (Narrator)
Yōkai Ningen Bem (2011, TV drama) (Narrator)
Seiyū Tantei (2021, TV drama) (Narrator)

Awards

References

External links
Haikyo profile 

1933 births
2022 deaths
Deaths from pneumonia in Japan
Japanese male video game actors
Japanese male voice actors
Nihon University alumni
Male voice actors from Tokyo
20th-century Japanese male actors
21st-century Japanese male actors
Tokyo Actor's Consumer's Cooperative Society voice actors
Lupin the Third